Filmstaden AB (formerly SF Bio AB ) is Sweden's largest cinema chain, and was founded in 1998 after Svensk Filmindustri was split into SF and SF Bio. The company is owned by the european group Odeon Cinemas Group, which has been owned by the world's largest cinema group, the American AMC Theatres since 2017.

The company is planned to be rebranded to "Filmstaden" on Bolagsverket due to the sale to AMC Theatres in 2017.

References

Cinemas and movie theaters chains
AMC Theatres
Cinemas in Sweden